is a three-episode OVA that takes place after the events of Super Robot Taisen: Original Generation 2, a Game Boy Advance game featuring only original characters and mecha created by Banpresto for the Super Robot Wars franchise.

Synopsis
Set after Original Generation 2, an unknown fleet of enemy mechs called Bartolls suddenly attacks the population of Earth, destroying all opposition, with millions of citizens instantly vanishing during the raids. ATX Team members Kyosuke, Excellen, and Bullet, along with Ryusei, Rai, and Aya of the SRX Team are sent to investigate, before the situation turns deadlier.

Media

Anime
The anime OVA is made up of three episodes. Episode 1, titled "Swarm of the Bartoll", was released on 27 May 2005. Episode 2, titled "People = Parts", was released on 26 August 2005, and the final episode, "Prisoner of the Maze", was released on 23 December 2005. The OVA premiered on Toku in the United States on December 31, 2015.

Drama CD
Along with the release of the three-episode OVA, Banpresto also produced a three-volume series of audio drama CDs entitled . Besides short omake segments, the Sound Cinemas introduced a new subplot to the anime. Featured within this side story were mecha, such as the Astelion AX and the Mironga.

Other media
The PlayStation 2 sequel to the Original Generation remake Original Generations, Original Generation Gaiden, deals with the events of the OVA, with new content and some taken from the Super Robot Wars Original Generation: The Sound Cinema drama CD.

Production
 Director: Jun Kawagoe
 Supervisor: Takanobu Terada
 Planning: Kazumi Kawashiro, Yasuhiko Yamaura
 Screenplay: Satoru Nishizono
 Original Character Design: Sachiko Kouno
 Original Mecha Design: Kazutaka Miyatake, Hajime Katoki, Saitou Kazue, Hitoshi Kamemaru, Hiroshi Ando, Junichi Moriya
 Character Design and Character Animation: Ryou Tanaka
 Mecha Design and Mecha Animation: Yasuhiro Saiki
 Music: Tsuneyoshi Saito
 Sound Director: Tooru Nakano
 Original Work: Banpresto
 Production: Brain's Base

External links
 Official Website  
 Official Bandai Visual Website   
 

2005 anime OVAs
Anime Works
Bandai Visual
Mecha anime and manga
Super Robot Wars